Nicolas Brûlart de Sillery''' (1544 – 1 October 1624) was a foreign minister and Lord Chancellor of France.

He was son of Pierre Brulart, seigneur de Berny and Marie Cauchon, dame de Sillery et de Puisieux.
 
He married Claude Prudhomme on 24 November 1574 and had five daughters and two sons, including Pierre Brûlart, marquis de Sillery , who was Secretary of State for Foreign Affairs from 24 April 1617 to 11 March 1626.

Sources
 Bernard Barbiche & Ségolène Dainville-Barbiche, Sully, Paris, 1997.
 Gédéon Tallemant des Réaux, Historiettes, Paris, 1960, édition révisée et annotée par Antoine Adam.
 Pierre Chevallier, Louis XIII, page 690.
 Phillipe Tamizey de Larroque, Lettres de Peiresc aux frères Dupuy, paris, 1888, tome 1, page 804.
 Suzanne et René Pillorget, France baroque, France Classique, Dictionnaire'', Paris, 1995, pages 173 et 174.

1544 births
1624 deaths
Secretaries of State for War (France)
Sillery, Nicolas Brulart de
Chancellors of France
17th-century French diplomats